Ethopia gigantea is a species of snout moth in the genus Ethopia. It was described by Owada in 1986, and is known from the Philippines.

References

Moths described in 1986
Tirathabini